The 1981 All-Ireland Senior Hurling Championship was the 95th staging of the All-Ireland Senior Hurling Championship, the Gaelic Athletic Association's premier inter-county hurling tournament. The draw for the 1981 fixtures took place in September 1980. The championship began on 24 May 1981 and ended on 6 September 1981.

Galway were the defending champions but were defeated by Offaly in the final. Westmeath re-entered the Leinster Championship after a three-year absence.

On 6 September 1981, Offaly won the championship following a 2–12 to 0–15 defeat of Galway in the All-Ireland final. This was their first All-Ireland title ever.

Limerick's Joe McKenna was the championship's top scorer with 7–12. Offaly's Pat Delaney was the choice for Texaco Hurler of the Year.

Teams

Results

Leinster Senior Hurling Championship

Quarter-finals

Semi-finals

Final

Munster Senior Hurling Championship

Quarter-final

Semi-finals

Final

All-Ireland Senior Hurling Championship

Quarter-final

Semi-finals

Final

Scoring statistics

Top scorers overall

Top scorers in a single game

Broadcasting

The following matches were broadcast live on television in Ireland on RTÉ.

Sources

 Corry, Eoghan, The GAA Book of Lists (Hodder Headline Ireland, 2005).
 Donegan, Des, The Complete Handbook of Gaelic Games (DBA Publications Limited, 2005).

References

1981
All-Ireland Senior Hurling Championship